Gilon is a community settlement in northern Israel. Located in the Lower Galilee on Mount Gilon seven kilometres west of Karmiel, it falls under the jurisdiction of Misgav Regional Council.

History
The village was established in 1980 by the Mishkei Herut Beitar movement as part of the Galilee lookouts plan to increase Jewish settlement in the area.

References

Community settlements
Populated places established in 1980
Populated places in Northern District (Israel)
1980 establishments in Israel